Smirnow is a transliteration variant of the Russian-language surname Smirnov. Notable people with the surname include:

Andrzej Smirnow, Polish politician
Zoya Smirnow (1897/98 – after 1916), Russian woman who fought during World War I disguised as a man

See also

Russian-language surnames